Tetragonoderus undatus is a species of beetle in the family Carabidae. It was described by Dejean in 1829. It is found in South America.

References

Beetles described in 1829
Beetles of South America
undatus
Taxa named by Pierre François Marie Auguste Dejean